Jazmin Hernández (born ) is a Mexican female volleyball player. She is a member of the Mexico women's national volleyball team and played for Nuevo León in 2014. She was part of the Mexico national team at the 2014 FIVB Volleyball Women's World Championship in Italy.

Clubs
  Nuevo León (2014)

References

1989 births
Living people

Mexican women's volleyball players
Place of birth missing (living people)